Professor   was a Japanese Australian ornithologist. His early zoological studies were at Tokyo University, Japan and at Oxford University in England. He subsequently spent three years at the University of Otago in New Zealand where he began what was to become an enduring focus of research, the behavioural ecology of Silvereyes and other species of Zosterops.

Early life 
Jiro Kakkawa was born in Japan on 15 December 1929. He studied his BSc at Tokyo University of Fisheries graduating with a degree in marine biology in 1950. He was a Technical Officer in the Ministry of Agriculture and Forestry in Japan from 1950 to 1953. He undertook postgraduate study at the University of Oxford from 1955 to 1956 and was a Teaching Fellow at the University of Otago from 1958 to 1961. He took his DSc in 1961 from Kyoto University.

Career 
In 1961 Kikkawa moved to Australia, first to the University of New England at Armidale, and then to the University of Queensland in 1965. He was Head of the Department of Zoology from 1980 to 1988. As well as his studies on white-eyes he is well known for his studies on the biogeography of Australian rainforest birds.

After joining the Royal Australasian Ornithologists Union (RAOU) in 1961, Kikkawa served on the RAOU Taxonomic Committee as well as on the editorial board of the RAOU journal Emu. In 1999 he was awarded the D.L. Serventy Medal for outstanding published work on birds in the Australasian region. As well as numerous published scientific papers, he authored and edited several books.

Kikkawa died on 30 May 2016 in Brisbane, Australia.

Memberships and Awards 
 Queensland Ornithological Society (Birds Queensland) - Founding member
 1972-1975 President of Queensland Ornithological Society.
 1974-1976 President of the Ecological Society of Australia
 1986, Gold Medal, Ecological Society of Australia
 1999 D.L. Serventy Medal, Birds Australia
 1999, Member of the Order of Australia

Legacy 
The Jiro Kikkawa memorial lecture honours Kikkawa since 2017. In the past grants were given to a researcher whose work best supports and advances bird conservation.

Selected works

References

 Anon. (1999). D.L. Serventy Medal 1999: Citation. Jiro Kikkawa. Emu 99: 227.
 Robin, Libby. (2001). The Flight of the Emu: a hundred years of Australian ornithology 1901-2001. Carlton, Vic. Melbourne University Press. 

1929 births
Japanese emigrants to Australia
Australian ornithologists
Members of the Order of Australia
Academic staff of the University of Queensland
2016 deaths